Kholm-Zhirkovsky is an urban locality (an urban-type settlement) in Kholm-Zhirkovsky District of Smolensk Oblast, Russia, located  northeast of Smolensk, about  west of Moscow, and  from the Moscow-Minsk highway.  Population: 

Kholm-Zhirkovsky was first mentioned in 1708. Urban-type settlement status was granted to it in 1971.

References

Urban-type settlements in Smolensk Oblast